Robert April III is an American football coach who is currently the Defensive Coordinator and Outside Linebackers Coach for the Stanford Cardinal.

Coaching career

College career
April III began his coaching career in 2004 as a student assistant for the Louisiana–Lafayette Ragin' Cajuns. He then became a graduate assistant for the Tulane Green Wave from 2005 to 2006. In 2007, April III became the special teams coordinator and inside linebackers coach for the Portland State Vikings through 2009.  In 2010, he was special teams coordinator and safeties coach for the Nicholls State Colonels.

In 2018, April III returned to college football as outside linebackers coach for the Wisconsin Badgers.

Professional career
April III was defensive quality control coach for the Philadelphia Eagles from 2011 to 2012. In 2013, April III moved to the New York Jets as defensive quality control coach and assistant linebacker coach. In 2014, he was promoted to linebackers coach with the Jets. In 2015, April III moved with Rex Ryan from the Jets to the Buffalo Bills and continued to serve as linebackers coach through 2016.

Personal life
April earned his bachelor's degree in sports management from Louisiana-Lafayette. He is the son of Bobby April Jr., a former NFL and college special teams coordinator.

References

External links
Buffalo Bills profile
Wisconsin profile

Living people
Buffalo Bills coaches
Louisiana Ragin' Cajuns football coaches
New York Jets coaches
Nicholls Colonels football coaches
Philadelphia Eagles coaches
Portland State Vikings football coaches
Tulane Green Wave football coaches
Wisconsin Badgers football coaches
Year of birth missing (living people)